Ronald Snook (born 5 May 1972 in Dalwallinu, Western Australia) is an Australian retired Olympic medal winning rower.

References 
 
 

1972 births
Living people
Australian male rowers
Rowers at the 1996 Summer Olympics
Olympic bronze medalists for Australia
Olympic rowers of Australia
Olympic medalists in rowing
People from Dalwallinu, Western Australia
Medalists at the 1996 Summer Olympics
20th-century Australian people